= The End of College Football =

2024 book by Nathan Kalman-Lamb and Derek Silva

The End of College Football: On the Human Cost of an All-American Game
- Authors: Nathan Kalman-Lamb and Derek Silva
- Language: English
- Subjects: Sociology
- Publisher: UNC Press
- Publication date: 2024
- Publication place: United States
- Media type: Print
- Pages: 272
- Awards: North American Society for the Sociology of Sport Outstanding Book Award (2025)
- ISBN: 9781469683461

The End of College Football: On the Human Cost of an All-American Game is a 2024 book by the sociologists Nathan Kalman-Lamb and Derek Silva, published by UNC Press. Through interviews with former college football players, the book addresses the relationship between the sport, harm, and exploitation. Kalman-Lamb and Silva frame this dynamic within overarching racial and economic inequalties. The book was awarded the 2025 Outstanding Book Award by the North American Society for the Sociology of Sport.

== Reception ==
Jonathan E. Howe, reviewing the book in the Sociology of Sport Journal, described it as "a comprehensive overview of the human costs of participating in big-time college football" and said that the authors' "unique contribution" is "the holistic perspective that they take to make the case for the negative impact" of the sport. Howe summarized the book as "a necessary provocation of the collegiate athletic system and exploitative sports systems in general".

In a review for the journal Leisure Studies, Stephen Crossley said that "the book deserves to be read widely" and praised it for "the clarity of argument, the power of the players' quotes, and the accessibility". Crossley described the book's methodological appendix as "excellent" and praised the authors for their "open approach", through which Crossley suggested they "effectively head off any discussion of potential shortcomings, weaknesses or criticisms of their work".

Jack Hardwicke reviewed the book for Critical Sociology, and described it as "a breath of much needed fresh air" in the sociology of sport. Hardwicke said that he book is a "detailed empirical account and moral critique of American Football" that "cuts through the myths that surround the dominant evangelistic and functionalist understandings of performance sports". Hardwicke praised the book as "genuinely critical and radical sociology" and summarized that the book "is promising evidence that the radical spirit lives on in sport scholarship".

=== Awards ===
- The North American Society for the Sociology of Sport's Outstanding Book Award (2025).
